Jagran Film Festival (JFF) is perhaps the world's largest travelling film festival rooted in India, conducted since 2010. The festival is a Jagran Prakashan Group initiative aimed at promoting the appreciation of the cinematic art beyond the major metropolitan cities of India to smaller towns. The seventh edition started in Delhi, travelling through Kanpur, Lucknow, Allahabad, Varanasi, Agra, Meerut, Dehradun, Hisar, Ludhiana, Patna, Ranchi, Jamshedpur, Raipur, Indore, and Bhopal, and culminated in Mumbai. The 8th edition offers prize money in various competitive film sections such as Jagran Shorts ( a competitive section for international short films), World Panorama ( a competitive section for international feature films), the Indian Showcase (a competitive section for Indian feature films) and Cinema of the Sellers ( a competitive section for advertising and public service advertising films)...

JFF-2019
10th Jagran Film Festival was inaugurated in an event held at Siri Fort Auditorium in New Delhi. It was inaugurated by Prakash Javadekar Union Minister of Information & Broadcasting .  binod

JFF-2018
9th edition of the Jagran Film Festival commenced in June in Delhi and culminated in Mumbai.

JFF-2017

 Partners: According to news reports Barry John Acting Studio (BJAS) is going to partner in the 8th season of Jagran Film Festival (JFF).
 Video Partners: According to news reports Veblr.com is the official video partner in the 8th season of Jagran Film Festival (JFF) 2017.

JFF-2016
 Consultants: Mayank Shekhar and Manoj Srivastava.
 Feature Film Competition Jury: Sarika, Jahnu Barua, Ballu Saluja, Sandesh Shandilya, Shekhar Das and Avinash Arun.
 International Competition for Short Films Jury: Jahnu Barua (Chairman), Rajit Kapur (Member), Elena Fernandes (Member)
Partners: Whistling Woods International, Mumbai, Asia Pacific Screen Awards

JFF 2015

Feature Film Competition Jury :Hariharan, Pooja Bhatt, Sreekar Prasad, Mahesh Aney, Udit Narayan
International Competition for Short Films: Shaji N. Karun (Chairman), Mozhgan Taraneh, Kunal Kapoor

JFF 2014
Feature Film Competition Jury: Amol Palekar (Chairman), Madhu Ambat, Kavita Lankesh, Umesh Gupta
International Competition for Short Films: Goutam Ghose (Chairman), Philip Cheah, Iokim Milonas

JFF 2013
Feature Film Competition Jury: [Basu Chatterjee] (Chairman), [(Ramakrishna Halkere)], [(Aditi Deshpandey)],[(Suresh Pai)]
International Competition for Short Films : [(N Chandra)], [(Dorothy Briere)]

References

http://www.bollywoodhungama.com/news/parties-and-events/akshay-nimrat-inaugurate-4th-jagran-film-festival/akshay-nimrat-inaugurate-4th-jagran-film-festival-4/
http://photogallery.navbharattimes.indiatimes.com/articleshow_v4/23031498.cms
http://businessofcinema.com/bollywood_hollywood_photos/photos-akshay-kumar-nimrat-kaur-launch-jagran-film-festival/105743/16

External links

Official website
Jagran Group
Official Video Channel Of 8th Jagran Film Festival 2017 on Veblr.com
http://www.mid-day.com/articles/5th-jagran-film-festival-finale-comes-to-mumbai/15573197
http://www.indianshowbiz.com/?tag=5th-jagran-film-festiva
9th Jagran Film Festival 2018

Film festivals in India